Strelka is a rural locality (a khutor) in Nizhneikoretskoye Rural Settlement, Liskinsky District, Voronezh Oblast, Russia. The population was 265 as of 2010.

Geography 
Strelka is located 25 km northeast of Liski (the district's administrative centre) by road. Sredny Ikorets is the nearest rural locality.

References 

Rural localities in Liskinsky District